City Air Terminal may refer to one of the following terminals:

Kuala Lumpur City Air Terminal, KL Sentral (Airport city terminal for Kuala Lumpur, Malaysia)
Makkasan Station, a station on the Airport Rail Link in Bangkok also known as City Air Terminal
Tokyo City Air Terminal in Nihonbashi, Tokyo, Japan
Korea City Air Terminal in COEX, Gangnam-gu, Seoul, Republic of Korea
Seoul Station City Airport Terminal, at Seoul Station Jung-gu/Yongsan-gu, Seoul, Republic of Korea